Ian Smales is an English former professional rugby league footballer who played in the 1980s and 1990s.

Playing career

International honours
Ian Smales was selected for Great Britain while at Featherstone Rovers for the 1990 Great Britain Lions tour, he played left-, i.e number 11, in Great Britain's 22-10 victory over Kiwi Colts at Addington Showgrounds, Christchurch on Wednesday 13 June 1990, played right-, i.e number 12, in the 10-18 defeat by Canterbury at Davies Park, Huntly on Wednesday 20 June 1990, played left-, i.e number 11, in the 20-32 defeat by Wellington at Porirua Park, Porirua on Wednesday 27 June 1990, and played  in the 24-0 victory over Taranaki at Pukekura Park, New Plymouth on Wednesday 4 July 1990.

County honours
Ian Smales won a cap for Yorkshire while at Featherstone Rovers; during the 1991–92 season against Lancashire.

Division Two Premiership Final appearances
Ian Smales played right- in Featherstone Rovers' 20-16 victory over Workington Town in the 1992–93 Divisional Premiership Final during the 1992–93 season at Old Trafford, Manchester on Wednesday 19 May 1993.

County Cup Final appearances
Ian Smales  played , in Featherstone Rovers' 14-20 defeat by Bradford Northern in the 1989 Yorkshire Cup Final during the 1989–90 season at Headingley, Leeds on Sunday 5 November 1989.

Regal Trophy Final appearances
Ian Smales played right- in Castleford Tigers' 33-2 victory over Wigan in the 1993–94 Regal Trophy Final during the 1993–94 at Headingley, Leeds on Saturday 22 January 1994.

Contemporaneous Article Extract
"Ian Smales Utility player. Can play , stand-off, and in the back row of the pack, and this versatility earned him a place in the 1990 Lions touring team to Papua New Guinea and New Zealand."

Outside of Rugby League
Ian Smales still attends Featherstone Rovers games, and now works as a Sport & Active Lifestyles’ Health & Fitness Officer, for Wakefield District Council. He is married to Keely Smales, and has a daughter; Alice Smales, and a son; Eli Smales.

Genealogical Information
Ian Smales is the son of the rugby league footballer who played in the 1950s and 1960s, and coached in the 1970s and 1980s; Tommy Smales.

References

External links
Profile at thecastlefordtigers.co.uk
(archived by web.archive.org) English Schools’ Rugby League Handbook 2005/06
(archived by web.archive.org) English Schools’ Rugby League Handbook 2006/07
Wigan 2 - 33 Castleford Sat 22 January 1994|Regal Trophy|Neutral Ground|15,626 
(archived by web.archive.org) Best Try Seen:  Regal Trophy Final 1994, Castleford V Wigan
Castleford > Stonessl > Results > 1997
Castleford Have Put the Second Row Ian Smales … On the Transfer List.
(archived by web.archive.org) January 1998 News

Club Together - The Newsletter for Sports Clubs in the Wakefield District – Edition 3
Wakefield Council's Pride Awards Ceremony Took Place On Friday 4 April 2008 > Winner of Healthier Communities
Healthy Changes 4 Life Conference
Tommy Smales and Ian Smales

1968 births
Living people
Castleford Tigers players
English rugby league players
Featherstone Rovers players
Great Britain national rugby league team players
Hunslet R.L.F.C. players
Place of birth missing (living people)
Rugby league utility players
Yorkshire rugby league team players